Březno is a municipality and village in Chomutov District in the Ústí nad Labem Region of the Czech Republic. It has about 1,400 inhabitants.

Administrative parts
Villages of Denětice, Holetice, Kopeček, Nechranice, Stranná, Střezov snd Vičice are administrative parts of Březno.

Transport
The municipality is located on a railway line leading from Lužná to Chomutov and Žatec. There is a train station which is served by regional trains. The Březno railway tunnel was built on a reallocated train track in 2007.

References

Villages in Chomutov District
Villages in the Ore Mountains